Pavilly is a commune in the Seine-Maritime department in the Normandy region in northern France.

Geography

Heraldry

Population

Places of interest
 The church of Notre-Dame, dating from the thirteenth century.
 The chapel of Sainte Austreberthe, all that remains of the thirteenth century priory that was founded by Philibert of Jumièges.
 The fourteenth-century château Esneval, built on the foundations of a feudal castle.

People
 Saint Austrebertha, born at Thérouanne (Pas-de-Calais) in 633, died at Pavilly on February 10 704. She was the first abbess at the convent of Pavilly.

See also
Communes of the Seine-Maritime department

References

External links

Official town website 

Communes of Seine-Maritime